Poshtu (also Romanized as Poshtū and Pashtoo; also known as Posthū and Pushtu) is a village in Riz Rural District of Riz District, Jam County, Bushehr province, Iran. At the 2006 census, its population was 798 in 194 households. The following census in 2011 counted 939 people in 256 households. The latest census in 2016 showed a population of 985 people in 270 households; it was the largest village in its rural district.

References 

Populated places in Jam County